Vauda Canavese is a comune (municipality) in the Metropolitan City of Turin in the Italian region Piedmont, located about  northwest of Turin.

Vauda Canavese borders the following municipalities: Busano, Rocca Canavese, Barbania, San Carlo Canavese, Front, and San Francesco al Campo.

References

Cities and towns in Piedmont
Canavese